The 2008 African Rally Championship season (ARC) was an international rally championship organized by the FIA. The champion was Japan driver Hideaki Miyoshi.

Calendar

Points

External links 
Results on official website

African Rally Championship
African Rally
Rally